Philobota lysizona is a moth of the family Oecophoridae. It is found in Australia.

References

Oecophoridae
Moths described in 1889